David O'Connor (born 8 February 1985) is an Irish football coach and former player.

Career
Born in Tallaght, Dublin, O'Connor grew up in nearby Oldbawn.

O'Connor began his career and leading Irish youth club, Cherry Orchard where he won a 3 All Ireland cups, a Premier Division medal, 2 league cups and the FAI Youth Cup before transferring to the League of Ireland where he has won two First Division titles.<

Shamrock Rovers
Following short spells at St Patrick's Athletic and an impressive loan spell at Kilkenny City, O'Connor then transferred to Shamrock Rovers. In his two seasons at Rovers, O'Connor won the 2006 First Division title and made the semi final of the FAI Cup in his this season and a League Cup semi final in his second season and went on to and make a total of 49 appearances scoring one goal.

Dundalk
During his time at Dundalk, O'Connor stated that "Our aim at the start of the season was to try and win the league...it would be great for everyone especially the supporters who have been great".

Whilst at Dundalk he was one of a group of Tallaght born footballers at the club. He made his competitive debut in March 2008 away to Shelbourne and is first goal for Dundalk come is a 6–0 drubbing of Kildare County.

Coming to the close in the season O'Connor outlined that "It's going really well for us at the moment so hopefully we can finish the season on a high note". In the run up to the end of the season O'Connor scored in the 2–1 win against Shelbourne to move Dundalk eight points clear at the end of the season and on to eventually winning the 2008 First Division title.

At the end of the season O'Connor then moved to County Louth rivals Drogheda United at the beginning of the Premier Division 2009 season.

Drogheda United
In June 2009, O'Connor scored his first goal in the Premier Division in what was described as the "biggest shock of the League of Ireland calendar". O'Connor came on as a 60th minute substitute in place of Robbie Martin for "the Boynesiders" with the game against Cork City level at one goal a piece. In the 80th minute a cross from teammate Jamie Duffy, who broke down the right side of the pitch, bounced into O'Connor's path and he drilled the ball home to the bottom right of the goal past the outstreched fingers of keeper Dan Connor to earn Drogheda a victory.

Honours
Shamrock Rovers
League of Ireland First Division (1): 2006

Dundalk
League of Ireland First Division (1): 2008

References

External links
O'Connor's goal for Dundalk versus Shelbourne
Official Profile of Dundalk F.C.

1985 births
Living people
Association footballers from County Dublin
Republic of Ireland association footballers
St Patrick's Athletic F.C. players
Kilkenny City A.F.C. players
Shamrock Rovers F.C. players
Dundalk F.C. players
Drogheda United F.C. players
League of Ireland players
Cherry Orchard F.C. players
Association football midfielders